Terra Mítica is a theme park located in Benidorm, Comunitat Valenciana, Spain. The park is divided into five themed zones: Egypt, Greece, Rome, Iberia, and the Islands (of the Mediterranean). The park opened in 2000.

In 2001, a year after park opening, Paramount Parks entered into an agreement to manage Terra Mítica, and the park was branded as a Paramount Park for the following season. In 2004, the park filed for the Spanish equivalent of bankruptcy protection from its creditors. Since then, the park has operated independently. Terra Mítica emerged from temporary receivership in 2006, after restructuring its expenses, reducing labor costs, and canceling debt through the sale of unused park land. After generating an average negative operating profit of 8 million € per year from its inception, Terra Mítica produced positive EBITDA in 2006.

For the 2008 season, Terra Mítica added a new free access area including major branded food chains and shops as well as an outdoor adventure park. Plans for the 2009 season included the addition of shopping outlets adjacent to the Iberia section of the park. A hotel was planned to be built by Ortiz Hijos in the area just behind the Egypt section of the park.

For the 2013 season, the park was divided into two separate parks: Iberia Park and Terra Mítica. Iberia Park is a free-admission area that requires tokens to be bought to access the rides. It covers half of the Egypt zone and all of the Iberia and Islands areas. Terra Mítica is a pay-to-enter area where all rides are free while inside. For the 2014 season, Iberia Park became gated, requiring a ticket to enter. Iberia Park is only open for two months from 2016 onwards.

In 2016, the Luxor Hotel was opened. To coincide with the hotel's opening, the season was reduced to three months, but prices were increased, causing many season pass holders to complain.

It appears as if in the 2021 season only Iberia Park reopened, as the map of Terra Mítica and all its attractions were removed from the website. In addition to that, some of Iberia Park's more elaborate attractions, such as El Rescate de Ulises (Ulysses' Rescue), also stayed closed.

Park Structure 

The park is organized into five thematic areas, each influenced by their respective origins:
 Egypt
 Greece
 Rome
 Iberia
 The Islands - This area is influenced by the ancient Mediterranean cultures and history.

In 2008, the following areas were added to the park:
 Ocionía - A free access area with themed shops, branded restaurants, and pay-as-you-go attractions. Ocionia is located just before the park entrance area.
 Atalaya - An outdoor adventure and obstacle course with challenges for adults and children alike. Atalaya is adjacent to the park entrance.

Rides
In total, there are 25 rides at the park. The list of rides by complexity is given below (strong - red colour, medium - yellow colour, easy - green colour, children - blue colour).

Shows

Calendar and admission
Terra Mitica is open almost every day in June, July, August, and the first week of September from 10.30 am to 8 pm, 9 pm or 10.30 pm (closing time varies). It opens from 10.30  to 7 pm on some selected days in May, October and November. It remains closed to whole months of December to April.

In 2016, a single adult ticket costs €38. A two-day adult ticket is €48. An afternoon adult ticket is €25. There are discounted tickets for juniors (5–10 years old), seniors (60 years and older), and disabled people. Children 0–5 years enter free.

Season passes are also available: adult season pass - €80 (family: €70); season pass renewal: no reduction as of 2016. For family season passes a proof of family relationship is required.

Incidents
On 7 July 2014, an Icelandic teenager was killed after his harness sprung open on Inferno. All other ZacSpin across the world ceased operations pending investigation findings from Terra Mítica and later reopened.

Notes

External links

 Terra Mítica Official Website 

Amusement parks in Spain
Buildings and structures in Benidorm
2000 establishments in Spain
Tourist attractions in the Valencian Community
Amusement parks opened in 2000